The Selayar Islands Regency is a regency of Indonesia in South Sulawesi province that covers the Selayar Islands, which lie to the south of Sulawesi. The regency covers an area of 1,357.03 km2, and had a population of 103,596 at the 2000 Census, 122,055 at the Census of 2010 and 137,071 at that of 2020. The official estimate for mid 2021 was 137,974. The Selayar Straits separate the regency from Sulawesi island.

Administration

Administrative Districts 

The Selayar Islands Regency is divided into eleven districts (kecamatan), tabulated below with their populations at the 2010 Census and the 2020 Census, together with the official estimates for mid 2021. The table also includes the administrative centres ('capitals') of the districts.

The six last-named constitute the main island (Selayar Island) which includes 41 smaller islands off its coast. The five first-named form the smaller island groups to the south and south-east of Selayar Island. Takabonerate District includes the huge atoll of the same name (with 28 named islands), together with the island of Kayuadi to its west. Further south, the districts of Pasimassunggu (21 islands), Pasimassunggu Timur (5 islands), Pasimamarannu (15 islands) and Pasilambena (17 islands) form a chain of smaller islands running west to east.

Regent 

The following are the names of the Leader / Regent of the Selayar Islands since 1739 until now :

Demography

Sea turtle village
Kampung Penyu (Sea turtle village) in Bontomanai district is sea turtle conservation area under supervision of Taka Bone Rate National Park.

Old pictures

See also 
 H. Aroeppala Airport

References

External links 
  http://selayar.org 
  http://wonderfulselayar.id
  
  https://web.archive.org/web/20120323015357/http://pariwisataselayar.com/
  https://archive.today/20121218120040/http://www.sulsel.go.id/content/kab-selayar
  http://regionalinvestment.com/newsipid/area.php?ia=7301
  Wikisource/Selayar Regency into Selayar Islands Regency
  Wikisource/Penduduk & ketenagakerjaan selayar tahun 2010
  Wikisource/Pariwisata selayar tahun 2010
  http://lombokcruises.com/indonesia-islands-destination/selayar-island
  http://www.selayar-dive-resort.com
  https://web.archive.org/web/20180827112802/http://www.selayarislandresort.com/

Regencies of South Sulawesi